Standard Editions was a short-lived imprint founded in New York by the artists Constance DeJong and Dorothea Tanning.

History 
DeJong and Tanning were introduced by Mimi Johnson at a party in New York. They started Standard Editions together and published DeJong's Modern Love as well as an unpublished manuscript of Tanning's from 1947 called Abyss.

Publications 
 The Lucy Amarillo stories. Constance DeJong, 1978.  
 Abyss. Dorothea Tanning, 1977.  
 Modern Love. Constance DeJong, 1975–1977.

References

Women in publishing
Political book publishing companies
Women book publishers (people)